The 3rd arrondissement of Lyon is one of the nine arrondissements of the City of Lyon.

Demography
 2006: 88,755 inhabitants
 2007: 89,000 inhabitants

It is the most populous arrondissement of Lyon and the second most densely populated after the 1st arrondissement of Lyon.
 Relative density :

History 
The 3rd arrondissement was created by the Decree of 24 March 1852 (date of creation of the first five arrondissements). The text of 17 July 1867 the district has shared in two by creating the 6th arrondissement of Lyon. Then the 3rd district found its current limits, after it was split again when the 7th arrondissement of Lyon has been established (Text 8 March 1912).

Area

Quarters 
The quarters of the 3rd arrondissement are :
 la Part-Dieu
 la Villette
 Montchat
 The north part of la Guillotière

Montchat is delimited at the North by the route de Genas, at the East by the Vinatier street and  boulevard Pinel, at the south Sud by the Rockefeller Avenue, the place d’Arsonval and the cours Albert Thomas' and at the West by the rue Feuillat.

 Monuments and buildings 
 Grand Temple de Lyon
 Tour Part-Dieu, called « Le Crayon »
 Tour Oxygène
 Tour Incity (project)
 Tour Swiss Life

 Street and places 
 Avenue de Saxe
 Rue de Créqui
 Rue de Vendôme
 Rue Duguesclin
 Rue Garibaldi

 Gardens and parks 
 Parc Bazin
 Parc Chambovet
 Parc Sisley
 Jardin de la Place Bir Hakeim
 Jardin Saint-Marie Perrin
 Square Jussieu

 Transports 
 Lyon Metro Line B Stations served : "Part-Dieu", "Place Guichard", "Saxe-Gambetta"
 Lyon Metro Line D stations served :'' "Saxe-Gambetta", "Garibaldi", "Sans-Souci", "Montplaisir-Lumière", "Grange-Blanche"
 Tramway T1 et T3

Schools and universities 
 Ecole maternelle et Primaire
 Molière, Collège public
 Lacassagne, Collège public
 Gilbert Dru, Collège public
 Professeur Dargent, Collège public
 Raoul Dufy, Collège public
 Bon Secours, Collège privé
 Charles de Foucauld, Collège privé
 Ampère-Saxe, Lycée public
 Lacassagne, Lycée public
 Charles de Foucauld, Lycée privé
 Montesquieu, Lycée privé

Sportive equipments 
 Stade Marc-Vivien Foé
 Stade Eugénie
 Gymnase Charial
 Gymnase Francisque Anselme
 Gymnase Mazenod
 Gymnase Rebatel
 Patinoire Baraban
 Piscine Charial (hiver)
 Piscine Garibaldi (hiver)

Cultural equipments 
 Auditorium Maurice-Ravel
 Bourse du Travail
 Bibliothèque municipale de la Part-Dieu
 Archives départementales du Rhône (section moderne : archives postérieures à 1800)
 Théâtre de la Tête d'Or

Animation 
 Mayor 
 2001-2008 : Patrick Huguet (UMP)
 2008- Today    : Thierry Philip (PS)

See also
Arrondissements of Lyon

References

External links
 Official site of the City hall of the 3rd arrondissement